Essie is an unincorporated community in Leslie County, Kentucky, United States.

A post office was established in 1924 by James Bowling, and named for his daughter, Essie.

References

Unincorporated communities in Leslie County, Kentucky
Unincorporated communities in Kentucky